Extremaduran is a group of vernacular Romance dialects, related to the Asturleonese language, spoken in Extremadura and adjoining areas in the province of Salamanca. It is difficult to establish the exact boundary between Extremaduran and the Spanish varieties spoken in most of Extremadura.

Dialects 
The linguistic varieties of Extremadura are usually classified in three main branches: Northern or "High" (artu estremeñu), Central or "Middle", and Southern or "Low". The northern branch is usually considered to be the language proper, and is spoken in the north-west of the autonomous region of Extremadura, and the south-west of Salamanca, a province of the autonomous region of Castile and León. The central and southern branches are spoken in the rest of Extremadura, and are not different enough from standard Spanish to be considered anything but dialects of the language, since at least the 18th century.

Northern Extremaduran is also spoken in a few villages of southern Salamanca, being known there as the "palra d'El Rebollal", which is now almost extinct.

History 
The late 19th century saw the first serious attempt to write in Extremaduran, until then an oral language, with the poet José María Gabriel y Galán. Born in Salamanca, he lived most of his life in the north of Cáceres, Extremadura. He wrote in a local variant of Extremaduran, full of dialectal remains, but always with an eye on Spanish usage.

After that, localisms are the pattern in the attempts to defend the Extremaduran language to the extent that today only a few people are trying to revive the language and make northern Extremadura a bilingual region, whereas the government and official institutions seem to think the best solution is for northwestern Extremadurans to speak a Castilian dialect without any kind of protection.

There are also attempts to transform the southern Castilian dialects ("castúo", as some people named them using the word which appeared in Luis Chamizo Trigueros's poems) into a language, which makes it even harder to defend High Extremaduran, considered more frequently a "real" language and makes it easier for the administration to reject co-officiality and the normalisation of Extremaduran.
It is in serious danger of extinction, with only the oldest people speaking it at present, while most of the Extremaduran population ignores the language, since the majority of Extremadurans, and even its own speakers, regard it as a poorly spoken Spanish.

In 2013, the people of Serradilla created the first feature film in Extremaduran, Territoriu de bandolerus.

Phonology 

 Features related to Astur-Leonese:
 Post-tonic o becomes u, e.g. oru  'gold'.
 Post-tonic e becomes i, e.g. calli  or  'street'.
 Latin word-final e, chiefly after d, is not lost, e.g. redi  'net'.
 Some cases of palatalization of word-initial n, e.g. ñíu  'nest'.
 Conservation of the consonantic group mb in intermediate position, e.g. lambel  'to lick'.
 Frequent conservation of word-initial  derived from a Latin f-. This consonant is lost in most Spanish varieties, but is common with much of Andalusia, e.g.   'fig'.
 Occasional conservation of word-initial f,  e.g.   'home, hearth'.
 Features related to southern peninsular Spanish:
 General loss of intervocalic d, e.g.   'fear'.
 Debuccalization of post-vocalic ,  and   into  (s-aspiration), e.g. estal  'to be'.
 Other features:
 Infinitives in -l, e.g. dil  'to go'.
 Metathesis of the consonant cluster rl into lr, e.g.   'to talk'.
 Occasional interchange of the liquid consonants l/r, e.g.   'clear'.<ref name="Ismael Carmona García">Ismael Carmona García's dictionary 2005 Izionariu castellanu-estremeñu</ref>
This feature is an archaism preserved from Old Spanish or Old Astur-Leonese, as it happens only when it is etymologically justified. When a voiced fricative appears, one also does in languages such as Catalan or Portuguese: Extremaduran tristeza  'sadness' (still voiced in Portuguese tristeza , voice lost in Spanish tristeza ), but Extremaduran cabeça  'head' (voiceless also in Portuguese cabeça , Spanish cabeza ). The feature is dying out quite fast but is found all over the High Extremaduran speaking area.

Morphology

 Anteposition of the article before the possessive pronoun, as in Old Spanish or in many Romance languages such as Leonese, Portuguese, Catalan or Italian.
 Anteposition of the particle lu (or lo), in some interrogative sentences.
 Use of diminutives inu and ina, as heritage from Leonese (as in Portuguese).
 Occasional formation of gerund, derived from a form of the verb in past tense.
 Usage of a vocative-exclamative case. When nouns are in the vocative, the closing of post-tonic vowels (e into i and o into u) disappears and those vowels open.  (Ramiro wants to come), but Ramiro, ven pacá (Ramiro, come here!). Sé quién lo vidu, Pepi (I know who saw it, Pepe did), but Sé quién lo vidu, Pepe (I know who saw it, Pepe). This is a characteristic shared with the Fala language. Extremaduran and the Fala language are actually the only western Romance languages with a distinct form of vocative case for nouns formed with a change in the ending.
 Usage of the preposition a with the verbs andal and estal indicating static temporal location, contrasting with the usage of en. Está a Caçris "He's in Cáceres (for a few days)", Está en Caçris "He's in Cáceres", Está pa Caçris "He's around Cáceres".
 A very frequent usage of deictic forms to which enclitic pronouns can be added at the end. They can be used in the middle of a sentence: Velaquí la mi casa (Here is my house), velallilu (there he is),  velaquí lechugas, millu... (Look, lettuce, corn and so on is grown here).
 Usage of reduplicated forms of plural pronouns with a reciprocal sense (ellus y ellus, vujotrus y vujotrus...): Estaban brucheandu ellus y ellus: They were wrestling with each other.

 Vocabulary 

 Usage of terms considered in Spanish as archaisms: ludia (Spanish levadura, "yeast").
 Presence of common terms from Andalusian Arabic: zagal (from Andalusian Arabic zaḡál'', "boy").

Comparative tables

* The words in this table refer only to High Extremaduran.

** Extremaduran words in this table are spelled according to Ismael Carmona García's orthography.

Organizations
There is a regional organization in Extremadura, OSCEC Estremaúra, that tries to defend the language, one journal (Belsana) and one cultural newspaper, Iventia, written in the new unified Extremaduran and the old dialect "palra d'El Rebollal".

Textual example

Writers
 José María Gabriel y Galán
 Miguel Herrero Uceda
 Elisa Herrero Uceda

See also
 Chinato
 Ramón Menéndez Pidal

References

External links

Languages of Spain and map 
APLEx Extremadura Cultural Society
Linguistic cartography of Extremadura, which offers 418 linguistic and ethnographic maps on rural lexicon 
a Short Comparative Grammar of the Astur-leonese Languages (in French) a linguistic comparison of all Astur-Leonese languages